Joel Silva may refer to:
 Joel Silva (volleyball) (born 1985), Venezuelan volleyball player
 Joel Silva (footballer, born 1990), Brazilian footballer
 Joel Silva (footballer, born 1989), Paraguayan footballer